Eliza McCartney (born 11 December 1996) is a New Zealand track and field athlete who competes in the pole vault and won the bronze medal in this event at the 2016 Summer Olympics. She also won the silver medal at the Summer Universiade in 2015. In 2018, she placed second at the Commonwealth Games.

Personal life
McCartney was born in Auckland, where she still lives in the seaside suburb of Devonport. Her father William McCartney previously competed in the high jump while her mother Donna Marshall previously competed as a gymnast. She has two younger brothers. She attended her local primary school and then Belmont Intermediate School and later moved onto Takapuna Grammar School, where she was in the same year as the singer-songwriter Lorde; the two played netball together. McCartney was most fond of netball growing up, with her height and agility giving her an advantage in playing defence. She also participated in a myriad of other sports in her youth, including cross country running, basketball, touch rugby, squash, tennis, swimming, and water polo. Eventually, she moved onto track and field, being a successful high jumper in her early teens before beginning pole vaulting in 2011. McCartney studies physiology at the University of Auckland.

Career

In 2011, at age 14, McCartney began pole vaulting. She has always been coached by Jeremy McColl. In 2012, McCartney won the national youth (under 18) title and the New Zealand secondary school championship. The following year she broke the New Zealand youth record and was selected for the 2013 World Youth Championships in Athletics where she finished fourth.

On 17 January 2016 she vaulted  in Brisbane, Australia improving her own national senior and junior records (but not the world junior record). McCartney and McColl's long-term goal had been for her to compete at the 2020 Summer Olympics in Tokyo, but it became clear during 2015 that the 2016 Summer Olympics in Rio de Janeiro may already be a possibility.

On 23 February 2016, she jumped  at the Vertical Pursuit international pole vault competition at Millennium Institute of Sport in Auckland, setting four new records: New Zealand national, New Zealand under 20, New Zealand resident, and New Zealand all comers. She was subsequently added to the New Zealand team to the 2016 IAAF World Indoor Championships

On 5 March 2016, she jumped  at the national championships in Dunedin, to surpass her own New Zealand record. It is not clear whether or not this set a new Oceania record. The IAAF normally requires a minimum of three competitors in an event for a record to be ratified and in this case, there were only two. Regardless, the Oceanian record was broken later in July 2016 by Alana Boyd of Australia, with a jump of 4.81 m.
 
McCartney made her senior international debut at the March 2016 IAAF World Indoor Championships in Portland, Oregon.

In April 2016, McCartney was selected to compete at the 2016 Summer Olympics in Rio de Janeiro. In the Olympic final, she cleared 4.50 m, 4.60 m, 4.70 m, and her personal best 4.80 m on her first attempts, but was eliminated after failing to clear 4.85 m. Her 4.80 m result and no misses up to that height saw her place ahead of Australia's Alana Boyd to win the bronze medal. At age 19 years and 252 days, McCartney became the youngest Olympic medallist in the women's pole vault. She was also only the fourth New Zealand Olympic medallist in a field event, after Yvette Williams (long jump, 1952), Valerie Adams (shot put, 2008, 2012, 2016), and Tomas Walsh (shot put, 2016). BMX rider Sarah Walker, an Olympic silver medallist, approached McCartney at the Halberg Awards ceremony on 18 February 2016 and has been mentoring her since.
	

On 24 June 2018, in Mannheim, Germany she improved upon her personal best to 4.86.  A few minutes later, she improved it again to 4.92.  The 4.92 ranks her as the fourth highest female vaulter in history. On 18 July 2018, at a "street vault" in Jockgrim, Germany, McCartney cleared 4.94m.  The vault was a new National and Oceania record and the #1 vault in the world in 2018.

In her first competition of 2019, McCartney cleared 4.85 m at the Potts Classic, breaking her New Zealand resident record. An achilles tendon injury in March 2021 prevented her from competing in the Tokyo Olympics. The same injury prevented McCartney from competing in the 2022 Commonwealth Games, but she has expressed a hope to return to competition for the 2024 Summer Olympics.

Notes 
1. An Athletics New Zealand Resident Record is the best performance by a New Zealander(s) in New Zealand.

Awards and recognition
McCartney won the Emerging Talent category of New Zealand's Halberg Awards for 2015 at an awards ceremony held on 18 February 2016. The year before, she was a finalist in the Halberg Awards Emerging Talent category, which was won by cyclist Regan Gough.

McCartney's 4.80 m vault that won her the Olympic bronze medal was voted New Zealand's Favourite Sporting Moment at the Halberg Awards for 2016.

Sponsorship and advertising work
In October 2016, McCartney became an ambassador for Beef and Lamb New Zealand, joining existing athlete ambassadors Lisa Carrington, Sophie Pascoe, and Sarah Walker. Also in October 2016, McCartney became a brand ambassador for Blueberries NZ. In December 2016, McCartney featured alongside several other notable New Zealanders in an aircraft safety video for Air New Zealand, entitled Summer of Safety. In June 2021, McCartney became the Hyundai NZ Electric Vehicle ambassador.

Statistics

Personal bests

Pole vault annual progression

International competitions

National titles
New Zealand National Track & Field Championships
 Pole vault: 2015, 2016, 2017

References

External links

Living people
1996 births
People from North Shore, New Zealand
Athletes from Auckland
New Zealand female pole vaulters
People educated at Takapuna Grammar School
Olympic athletes of New Zealand
Athletes (track and field) at the 2016 Summer Olympics
Athletes (track and field) at the 2018 Commonwealth Games
Medalists at the 2016 Summer Olympics
Olympic bronze medalists for New Zealand
Olympic bronze medalists in athletics (track and field)
Universiade medalists in athletics (track and field)
Commonwealth Games medallists in athletics
Commonwealth Games silver medallists for New Zealand
Universiade silver medalists for New Zealand
Medalists at the 2015 Summer Universiade
Medallists at the 2018 Commonwealth Games